Of Life and Death is a 1930 German thriller film directed by Edmund Heuberger and starring Eddie Polo, Rina Marsa and Lotte Stein. It was shot at the Johannisthal Studios in Berlin. The film's sets were designed by the art director Gustav A. Knauer and Willy Schiller. It was distributed by the German branch of Universal Pictures.

Cast
 Eddie Polo as Artist
 Rina Marsa as Dame
 Lotte Stein as Madame Delbanco
 Peggy Norman as Eveline
 Angelo Ferrari as van Straaten
 Fred Grosser as Junge
 Rolf von Goth as Paul
 Karl Falkenberg as Erster Herr
 Hans Ritter as Zweiter Herr

References

Bibliography

External links

1930 films
1930s thriller films
German thriller films
Films of the Weimar Republic
German silent feature films
Films directed by Edmund Heuberger
Universal Pictures films
German black-and-white films
Silent thriller films
1930s German films
Films shot at Johannisthal Studios